Seoirse Bulfin (born 1979) is an Irish hurling manager and former player. He has had a close association as a coach with Davy Fitzgerald with a number of inter-county teams. Bulfin has been manager of the Meath senior hurling team since 2022.

Playing career
Bulfin first played hurling at juvenile and underage levels with the Bruff club. He eventually progressed onto the club's adult teams with whom he had a 20-year association before his retirement in 2017. As a student at Mary Immaculate College, Bulfin lined out for the college's senior team in the Fitzgibbon Cup and captained the team in his final year in 2003. At inter-county level, he was goalkeeper on the Limerick minor hurling team during the 1997 Munster MHC campaign.

Coaching career
Buflin's coaching career began after being appointed GAA development officer at Limerick Institute of Technology in 2003. It was here that he began his close association with Davy Fitzgerald and he was part of the LIT management team for the Fitzgibbon Cup successes in 2005 and 2007. Bulfin joined Fitzgerald as coach to the Waterford senior hurling team in 2011 before later taking up the coaching role with the Clare senior hurling team. During his five-year tenure Clare won a first National Hurling League title in 38 years as well as the All-Ireland SHC title in 2013. The Fitzgerald-Bulfin combination later brought a Leinster SHC title to Wexford in 2019. He was appointed manager of the Meath senior hurling team in August 2022, having spent the previous year as team coach.

Honours
Limerick Institute of Technology
Fitzgibbon Cup: 2005, 2007

Ballyagran
Limerick Senior Camogie Hurling Championship: 2011

Clare
All-Ireland Senior Hurling Championship: 2013
National Hurling League: 2016

Wexford
Leinster Senior Hurling Championship: 2019

References

1979 births
Living people
Bruff hurlers
Hurling coaches
Hurling goalkeepers
Hurling managers
Limerick inter-county hurlers